The 19th Legislative Assembly of Quebec was the provincial legislature that existed in Quebec, Canada for less than a year from November 25, 1935, to August 17, 1936. The Quebec Liberal Party led by Louis-Alexandre Taschereau was in power for another consecutive term but he was replaced a few months before the elections by Adélard Godbout. However, it was the Liberals' final term before being defeated in 1936 by Maurice Duplessis' Union Nationale which was formed as a result of a merger between the Action libérale nationale and the Quebec Conservative Party between the 1935 and 1936 elections.

Seats per political party

 After the 1935 elections

Member list

This was the list of members of the Legislative Assembly of Quebec that were elected in the 1935 election:

Other elected MLAs

No other MLAs were elected in by-elections during the term

Cabinet Ministers

Taschereau Cabinet (1935-1936)

 Prime Minister and Executive Council President: Louis-Alexandre Taschereau
 Agriculture: Adélard Godbout
 Colonization, Hunting and Fishing: Hector Laferté
 Labour: Charles-Joseph Arcand (1935), Joseph-Napoleon Francoeur (1935-1936), Edgar Rochette (1936)
 Colonization: Irénée Vautrin (1935), Joseph-Edouard Perrault (1935-1936), Hector Authier (1936)
 Public Works, Hunting and Fishing: Joseph-Napoléon Francoeur (1934-1935)
 Mines:Joseph-Edouard Perrault (1935-1936), Joseph-Napoleon Francoeur (1936)
 Lands and Forests: Honoré Mercier Jr 
 Roads: Joseph-Édouard Perrault (1935-1936), Pierre-Emile Cote (1936)
 Municipal Affairs, Industry and Commerce: Télesphore-Damien Bouchard 
 Attorney General: Louis-Alexandre Taschereau (1935-1936), Joseph-Edouard Perrault (1936)
 Provincial secretary: Athanase David 
 Treasurer: Louis-Alexandre Taschereau (1931-1932), Ralph Frederick Stockwell (1932-1935)
 Members without portfolios: Cleophas Bastien (1936)

Godbout Cabinet (1936)

 Prime Minister and Executive Council President: Adélard Godbout
 Agriculture and Colonization: Adélard Godbout
 Labour, Hunting and Fishing: Edgar Rochette
 Public Works and Mines: Césaire Gervais
 Roads: Pierre-Émile Côté
 Municipal Affairs, Lands and Forests: Télesphore-Damien Bouchard 
 Industry and Commerce: Wilfrid Gagnon
 Attorney General and provincial secretary: Charles-Auguste Bertrand
 Treasurer: Edward Stuart McDougall
 Members without portfolios: Frank Lawrence Connors, Cléophas Bastien

References
 1935 election results
 List of Historical Cabinet Ministers

19